Edward John Ward (7 March 189931 July 1963) was an Australian politician who represented the Australian Labor Party (ALP) in federal parliament for over 30 years. He was the member for East Sydney for all but six-and-a-half weeks from 1931 until his death in 1963.  He served as a minister in the Curtin and Chifley Governments from 1941 to 1949, and was also known for his role in the ALP split of 1931.

Ward was born in Sydney and left school at the age of 14; he became involved in the labour movement at a young age. He was elected to the Sydney Municipal Council in 1930, and the following year won Labor preselection for the 1931 East Sydney by-election. He was elected to the House of Representatives, but Prime Minister James Scullin refused him admission to the ALP caucus due to his support for Jack Lang. Ward and six other "Lang Labor" MPs formed a separate parliamentary party and eventually brought down Scullin's government. He lost his seat at the 1931 federal election. However, his successor John Clasby died only a month later and he re-entered parliament at the ensuing by-election, and held the seat until his death.

In 1941, Ward was elected to cabinet by the ALP caucus and appointed Minister for Labour and National Service by Prime Minister John Curtin. He had an uneasy relationship with Curtin, and his claims about the "Brisbane Line" led to a royal commission which found they were unsubstantiated. He received an effective demotion after the 1943 election, becoming Minister for Transport and External Territories. He held those offices until Labor lost power in 1949. Ward stood for the deputy leadership of the ALP on numerous occasions, and also mounted a challenge for the leadership against H. V. Evatt in 1959. He died in office in 1963, having been the longest-serving MP since 1961.

Early life
Ward was born on 21 March 1899 in Darlington, Sydney, New South Wales. He was the fourth child and oldest son born to Mary Ann (née Maher) and Edward James Ward; his father worked for the Sydney tramways. His parents, born in Australia, were of Irish Catholic descent.

Ward began his education at the St Francis de Sales convent school, later attending the Cleveland Street Public School and the Crown Street Public School. He left school at the age of 14 and worked variously as a fruit-picker, printer's devil, tarpaulin-maker, and as a clerk at a hardware store. He eventually found work at the Eveleigh Railway Workshops, but was sacked for his involvement in the 1917 general strike. In 1919 he received a head injury while protesting the deportation of labour leader Paul Freeman. During the 1920s, Ward worked on the tramways as a labourer and chainman. He supplemented his income by boxing professionally. He married Edith Bishop on 27 September 1924, with whom he had two children.

Ward joined the Labor Party at the age of 16, and became the president of its Surry Hills branch. He served as campaign director for Jack Beasley at the 1929 federal election. The following year, he was elected to the Sydney Municipal Council as the alderman for Flinders Ward. He served on the council's committees for works, electricity, and health.

Politics

Early years

Ward was first elected to the House of Representatives at the 1931 East Sydney by-election in the midst of the Great Depression and the rise to prominence of NSW's Labor Premier Jack Lang, whose policies for dealing with the depression were considered radically left wing. Ward was a Lang supporter and gained notoriety soon after his election when Prime Minister and ALP leader James Scullin refused to allow Ward into the ALP caucus.  In response, Ward joined Jack Beasley and three other Lang supporters in forming the "Australian Labor Party (NSW)," popularly known as "Lang Labor." Eight months later, Ward and the other Lang Labor members voted with the opposition on a no-confidence motion to bring down the Scullin government.

Ward lost his seat later that year to the United Australia Party at the federal election. The Labor vote was split between Ward and official ALP candidate George Buckland. On the second count, just over half of Buckland's preferences flowed to UAP candidate John Clasby, allowing Clasby to win. As luck would have it, Clasby died less than a month after the election before he even took his seat in parliament. At the ensuing February 1932 by-election, Ward reclaimed the seat, again as a Lang Labor candidate.

Ward remained in Lang Labor until 1936, when he returned to the ALP. Nevertheless, he would continue to have a prickly relationship with many of his Labor colleagues for the rest of his life.

One such issue that set Ward apart from his parliamentary colleagues was his opposition to any form of defence spending.  During the 1936 budget debate, he argued that any funding earmarked for defence would be better spent on welfare and unemployment relief.  In reference to a move to increase the size of the Royal Australian Navy, Ward said:
I wonder if such vessels are really needed for the defence of Australia, or whether they are not required for the purpose of helping other peoples defend rich possessions in other parts of the world.

Although in retrospect, Ward's opposition to defence spending appears foolhardy in view of what would occur in the following years, his stance did reflect the thinking of many Australians at the time.

Government minister
In 1941, Ward entered the ministry of new Prime Minister John Curtin. Ward served as Minister for Labour and National Service before being moved to Minister for Transport and Minister for External Territories in 1943, considered a demotion – Curtin pointed out that "the Japs [Japanese] have got the External Territories and the Army's got the transport", leaving Ward with little to administer. Even before then, however, Ward barely concealed his hostility to Curtin; for instance, he once accused Curtin of "putting young men into the slaughterhouse, although thirty years ago you would not go into it yourself".

Following the death of Curtin in 1945, Ward nominated for leadership of the Labor Party, which would have resulted in him becoming Prime Minister, but lost to Ben Chifley.  Ward would continue to harbour leadership aspirations throughout the rest of his career. Rarely, if ever, did he have a friendly working relationship with any ALP leader.

After World War II, Ward remained in the spotlight. He vigorously opposed the Bretton Woods system and Australia joining the International Monetary Fund and the International Bank for Reconstruction (later one of five institutions in the World Bank Group), because he believed international financiers were responsible for the Depression in Australia during the 1930s.  Ward argued that signing Bretton Woods would "enthrone a World Dictatorship of private finance, more complete and terrible than any Hitlerite dream"; destroy Australian democracy; pervert and paganise Christian ideals; and endanger world peace.  It was outbursts like these that would continue to stymie his leadership ambitions within the Labor Party.

He was famous for sardonically "welcoming" Menzies back to Australia after his many three-month absences in England at the beginning of each parliamentary year. Ward was the subject of a parliamentary outburst by Menzies (who had apparently drunk too much) during a discussion of the Communist Party Dissolution Bill. Ward often criticised Menzies and in 1944, had called him "a posturing individual with the scowl of a Mussolini, the bombast of a Hitler and the physical proportions of a Göring".

His highest contempt, however, was for those who he considered had betrayed the working class.  He refused an invitation to a function celebrating Labor-turned-Nationalist Prime Minister Billy Hughes' 50 years in parliament, saying "I don't eat cheese", a reference to Hughes' nickname of "Billy the Rat".

Later years

Following the 1946 election, Ward nominated for Deputy Leader of the Labor Party but was beaten by Herbert Vere Evatt. Setting a trend, he was again nominated for deputy leader in 1951, coming third behind Arthur Calwell and the comparatively little-known Percy Clarey; and in 1960, when he lost narrowly to future Prime Minister Gough Whitlam, despite getting the support of newly elected leader Arthur Calwell who had disliked Whitlam. In 1961, upon the defeat of Earle Page, Ward became the Father of the Australian House of Representatives. However, with the end of his leadership aspirations and the onset of advanced atherosclerosis, diabetes mellitus and heart disease, Ward was losing political importance although he was still seen as an elder statesman of the Labor Party.
The ALP had narrowly lost the 1961 election under the leadership of Arthur Calwell. Calwell would later write in his autobiography that he believed that the party could have won the 1961 election if Ward had been his deputy instead of Whitlam.
He was still serving as Member for East Sydney when he died at St Vincent's Hospital, Darlinghurst of a heart attack.  Asked when he knew that his health was failing, he said it was when he "took a swing at Gough Whitlam, and missed." He was given a state funeral and buried with Catholic rites in Randwick Cemetery.

Arthur Calwell eulogised Ward as an irrepressible fighter and unrelenting hater whilst Curtin had dismissed him as a "bloody ratbag." The journalist Arthur Hoyle believed that many of Ward's generation believed that he was 'most authentic voice that the working class in Australia has had'.

Notes

References
Eddie Ward: Firebrand of East Sydney, Elwyn Spratt, Rigby, 1965
Eddie Ward – The Truest Labor Man, Arthur Hoyle, SP, Canberra, 1994

External links

1899 births
1963 deaths
Australian people of Irish descent
Australian Roman Catholics
Australian Labor Party members of the Parliament of Australia
Labor Left politicians
Australian socialists
20th-century Australian politicians
Lang Labor members of the Parliament of Australia
Members of the Australian House of Representatives for East Sydney
Members of the Australian House of Representatives
Members of the Cabinet of Australia